Lee Min-sik (born 5 July 2000) is a South Korean snowboarder. Lee competed at the 2018 Winter Olympics for South Korea.

References

External links

South Korean male snowboarders
Snowboarders at the 2018 Winter Olympics
Olympic snowboarders of South Korea
2000 births
Living people
Snowboarders at the 2017 Asian Winter Games
Snowboarders at the 2016 Winter Youth Olympics
Competitors at the 2023 Winter World University Games
21st-century South Korean people
Universiade medalists in snowboarding
Universiade gold medalists for South Korea